Cumberland Falls State Resort Park is a park located just southwest of Corbin, Kentucky and is contained entirely within the Daniel Boone National Forest. The park encompasses  and is named for its major feature,  Cumberland Falls. The falls are one of the few places in the western hemisphere where a moonbow can frequently be seen on nights with a full moon. The park is also the home of  Eagle Falls. The section of the Cumberland River that includes the falls was designated a Kentucky Wild River by the Kentucky General Assembly through the Office of Kentucky Nature Preserves' Wild Rivers System. The forest in the park is also a dedicated State Nature Preserve.

History
After the discussion of building a hydroelectric power plant above the falls in 1927, Kentucky native T. Coleman du Pont offered to buy the falls and surrounding acreage in order to create a state park. Although he died before he could purchase the land, his wife purchased the falls and the  surrounding it for $400,000 on March 10, 1930, after the Kentucky General Assembly (legislature) approved the creation of the state park. Cumberland Falls was dedicated as a state park at 1:30 p.m. on August 21, 1931.

Following a $2 million renovation project in 2006, the park received an upgraded rating from two diamonds to three diamonds from the American Automobile Association (AAA) in 2007. Kentucky Dam Village State Resort Park also received the upgraded rating. The two facilities were the first state resort parks to achieve the three-diamond rating following AAA's revision of its rating system in 2001.

Recreation
 Visitor's center 
 Interpretive center 
 Tennis Court
 Playgrounds
 Firepits 
 Picnic tables in each cabin group, perfect for a cookout  
 Mountain biking
 Hiking - approximately 20 miles of trails
 Fishing in Cumberland River 
 Horseback rides
 Pool (recently refurbished)
 Different activities by the week for guests of the park such as square dancing, archery, arts and crafts, group hikes, and animal encounters
 White water rafting and canoeing on Cumberland River

The Dupont Lodge 
 51 guest rooms
 3 stories
 Home to the Riverview Restaurant which serves breakfast, lunch, and dinner
 Patio outlook onto the Cumberland River
 Maid services provided
 Internet access

Cabins
 Multiple modern one and two-bedroom 
 Two different cabin groups 
 In a standard one story cabin, there are two bedrooms, two bathrooms, a living room, a dining room and a kitchen
 There are also a few two-story cabins with the living room, kitchen, a half-bathroom, and a dining room upstairs, and the two bedrooms and connecting bathrooms downstairs
 Both cabin groups are dog-friendly
 Maid services provided
 Many cabins have been renovated 
 Newly added internet access to both cabin groups
 There are "Woodland Suites" available that have the experience of a cabin, but at a smaller size and cheaper cost

Events
Backpacking 101 - (Several times a year)
Native American Weekend - (March)
Overnight Canoe Adventures - (April, May, October)
Nature Photography Weekend - (April)
Birding and Wildflower Weekend - (May)
Kentucky Hills Craft Festival - (September)
Moonbow Trail Trek - (November)

Hazards
 The Daniel Boone National Forest is home to much wildlife, and although there are several beautiful animals, make sure to watch out for black bears and copperhead snakes
 The falls used to be an area of recreation for swimming, but has been shut down due to the dangerous current of the river
 Each year people try to canoe over the falls, but this is very dangerous because of the rocks located underneath the waterfall

References

External links

Cumberland Falls State Resort Park Kentucky Department of Parks
Cumberland Falls State Resort Park at American Byways

State parks of Kentucky
Protected areas of McCreary County, Kentucky
Protected areas of Whitley County, Kentucky
Protected areas established in 1931
Daniel Boone National Forest
1931 establishments in Kentucky